Marc Martínez Aranda (born 4 April 1990) is a Spanish professional footballer who plays for as a goalkeeper for Spanish club FC Cartagena.

Club career
Born in Barcelona, Catalonia, Martínez was a FC Barcelona youth graduate. On 20 July 2009, after finishing his formation, he signed for Racing de Santander and was immediately assigned to the reserves in Segunda División B.

Martínez made his senior debut on 1 November 2009, starting in a 1–3 away loss against Atlético Madrid B. A third-choice behind Mario Fernández and Pablo Gómez, he only appeared in five matches during the campaign, which ended in relegation.

On 4 July 2011, Martínez agreed to a contract with another reserve team, Deportivo Fabril in Tercera División. On 31 July 2013, after being a starter, he terminated his contract and moved to Elche CF's reserves, but left the latter club the following 30 January and subsequently returned to Dépor to work as Fabri's backup, due to Germán Lux's injury.

Martínez continued to appear in the third division in the following years, representing UD Logroñés, UD Somozas, CD Alcoyano, Recreativo de Huelva and FC Cartagena, achieving promotion to Segunda División with the latter in 2020.

Martínez made his professional debut at the age of 30 on 13 September 2020, starting in a 0–0 away draw against Real Oviedo.

References

External links

1990 births
Living people
Footballers from Barcelona
Spanish footballers
Association football goalkeepers
Segunda División players
Segunda División B players
Tercera División players
Rayo Cantabria players
Deportivo Fabril players
Elche CF Ilicitano footballers
UD Logroñés players
UD Somozas players
Recreativo de Huelva players
FC Cartagena footballers